Averasboro Township is one of thirteen townships in Harnett County, North Carolina, United States. The township had a population of 12,965 according to the 2000 census and is the largest township in Harnett County by population. It is a part of the Dunn Micropolitan Area, which is also a part of the greater Raleigh–Durham–Cary Combined Statistical Area (CSA) as defined by the United States Census Bureau.

Geographically, Averasboro Township occupies  in southeastern Harnett County.  The only incorporated municipality within Averasboro Township is Dunn.  Averasboro Township is named for the former town of Averasborough which was the site of an American Civil War battle known as the Battle of Averasborough.

Townships in Harnett County, North Carolina
Townships in North Carolina